Grey's Anatomy  is an American medical drama television series that premiered on the American Broadcasting Company (ABC) as a mid-season replacement on March 27, 2005. The series focuses on the fictional lives of surgical interns and residents as they evolve into seasoned doctors while trying to maintain personal lives. The show's premise originated with Shonda Rhimes, who serves as an executive producer, along with Betsy Beers, Mark Gordon, Krista Vernoff, Rob Corn, Mark Wilding, and Allan Heinberg. The series was created to be racially diverse, utilizing a color-blind casting technique. It is primarily filmed in Los Angeles. The show's title is a play on Gray's Anatomy, the classic human anatomy textbook.

Episodes have been broadcast on Thursday nights since Grey's third season. The first two seasons aired after Desperate Housewives in the Sunday 10:00 pm EST time-slot. All episodes are approximately forty-three minutes, excluding commercials, and are broadcast in both high-definition and standard. Episodes are also available for download at the iTunes Store in standard and high definition, and Amazon Video, with new episodes appearing the day after their live airings. ABC Video on demand also releases episodes of the show, typically one to two days after their premieres. Recent episodes are available on ABC's Android/iTunes app or at ABC's official Grey's Anatomy website, and on Hulu. In 2010, ABC signed a deal allowing Grey's Anatomy episodes to be streamed on Netflix. In April 2018, Grey's Anatomy became the longest running drama ever for ABC, after the network renewed the series for a fifteenth season.

Grey's Anatomy was among the ten highest-rated shows in the United States from the show's first through fourth season. The show's episodes have won a number of awards, including a Golden Globe Award for Best Drama Series, a People's Choice Award for Favourite TV Drama, and multiple NAACP Image Awards for Outstanding Drama Series. Since its premiere, Buena Vista Home Entertainment has distributed all seasons on DVD. There have been several special episodes recapping events from previous episodes, and two series of webisodes.

On May 10, 2021, ABC renewed the show for an eighteenth season, which premiered on September 30, 2021. On January 10, 2022, ABC renewed the show for a nineteenth season.  The nineteenth season premiered on October 6, 2022.

Series overview

Episodes

Season 1 (2005)

Season 2 (2005–06)

Season 3 (2006–07)

Season 4 (2007–08)

Season 5 (2008–09)

Season 6 (2009–10)

Season 7 (2010–11)

Season 8 (2011–12)

Season 9 (2012–13)

Season 10 (2013–14)

Season 11 (2014–15)

Season 12 (2015–16)

Season 13 (2016–17)

Season 14 (2017–18)

Season 15 (2018–19)

Season 16 (2019–20)

Season 17 (2020–21)

Season 18 (2021–22)

Season 19 (2022–23)

Specials

Webisodes

Seattle Grace: On Call

Seattle Grace: Message of Hope

Grey's Anatomy: B-Team

References 
General

 
 

Specific

External links 

 
 

Grey's Anatomy
Grey's Anatomy episodes